Ndue Mujeci (born 24 February 1993 in Shkodër) is an Albanian professional footballer who currently plays as a forward for FK Jezero.

Club career
In August 2016, Mujeci joined Bulgarian club Pirin Blagoevgrad but was released in January.

On 5 January 2017, he signed a  year contract with fellow Bulgarian club Dunav Ruse. He was released in June 2017.

On 14 July 2017, Mujeci signed a 1-year contract with Georgian Premier League side Saburtalo.

On 23 January 2018, he signed a 6 month contract with Northern Cyprus club Gençlik Gücü.

On 17 August 2018, Mujeci arrived in Hong Kong to sign a contract with Hong Kong First Division club Happy Valley.

On 11 September 2019, Mujeci signed with Northern Cypriot club Cihangir. In January 2020, he then moved to Akademija Pandev in North Macedonia, before joining Montenegrin First League club FK Jezero in September 2020.

Honours

Club
Happy Valley
Hong Kong First Division: 2018–19

References

External links
 
 HKFA

1993 births
Living people
Footballers from Shkodër
Albanian footballers
Association football forwards
KF Vllaznia Shkodër players
KS Ada Velipojë players
FK Ventspils players
OFC Pirin Blagoevgrad players
FC Dunav Ruse players
FC Saburtalo Tbilisi players
Happy Valley AA players
Akademija Pandev players
FK Jezero players
Kategoria Superiore players
Latvian Higher League players
First Professional Football League (Bulgaria) players
Hong Kong First Division League players
Erovnuli Liga players
Macedonian First Football League players
Montenegrin First League players
Albanian expatriate footballers
Expatriate footballers in Latvia
Expatriate footballers in Bulgaria
Expatriate footballers in Georgia (country)
Expatriate footballers in Northern Cyprus
Expatriate footballers in Hong Kong
Expatriate footballers in North Macedonia
Expatriate footballers in Montenegro
Albanian expatriate sportspeople in Latvia
Albanian expatriate sportspeople in Bulgaria
Albanian expatriate sportspeople in Georgia (country)
Albanian expatriate sportspeople in North Macedonia
Albanian expatriate sportspeople in Montenegro